Robert Ramsey (born 24 February 1935) is an English former professional footballer who played as a full back in the Football League for York City and was on the books of Huddersfield Town without making a league appearance.

References

1935 births
Living people
Footballers from Sunderland
English footballers
Association football fullbacks
Huddersfield Town A.F.C. players
York City F.C. players
English Football League players